"Avenging Angels" is a song by English band Space, released as the band's first single from the band's second album Tin Planet on 29 December 1997. The song reached number six on the UK Singles Chart and number 20 in Iceland in January 1998. In Australia, "Avenging Angels" peaked at number 146 on the ARIA Singles Chart.

Track listings
UK CD1
 "Avenging Angels" – 3:10
 "I'm Unlike Any Lifeform You've Ever Met" – 3:26
 "Bastard Me, Bastard You" – 4:26
 "Theme from 'Barretta Vendetta'" – 6:05

UK CD2
 "Avenging Angels" – 3:10
 "Avenging Angels" (John 'OO' Fleming theramin mix) – 7:07
 "Avenging Angels" (Ultra Vegas mix) – 7:01
 "Avenging Angels" (The Jumping Soundboy mix) – 6:34
 "Avenging Angels" (Franny's 'Peaceful Devil' mix) – 4:34
 "Avenging Angels" (Brainbasher's 'Kick Ass Angel' mix) – 6:20
 "Avenging Angels" (Jonnie Newman's 'Altered State' mix) – 4:02

UK cassette single
A. "Avenging Angels" – 3:10
B. "Bastard Me, Bastard You" – 4:26

Australian CD single
 "Avenging Angels" – 3:10
 "Avenging Angels" (Jonnie Newman's 'Altered State' mix) – 4:02
 "Avenging Angels" (Franny's 'Peaceful Devil' mix) – 4:34
 "Avenging Angels" (Ultra Vegas mix) – 7:01
 "Avenging Angels" (The Jumping Soundboy mix) – 6:34
 "Theme from 'Barretta Vendetta'" – 6:05

Charts

Weekly charts

Year-end charts

References

External links
 "Avenging Angels" article

Space (English band) songs
1997 singles
1997 songs
UK Independent Singles Chart number-one singles